Carl Lee Crennel (born September 14, 1948) is a former linebacker in the National Football League, and the Canadian Football League. He played for one season with the Pittsburgh Steelers in the NFL, and for several different teams in the CFL, most notably Montreal Alouettes from 1972-1979; he won two Grey Cup championships with the Alouettes, and one with the Edmonton Eskimos. He was drafted in the 1970 NFL Draft out of West Virginia, where he captained the Mountaineers to a 10-1 record in 1969 and a victory in the Peach Bowl; he was named MVP in the game. In 1998 Crennel was made a member of the West Virginia University Sports Hall of Fame.

He is the younger brother of Romeo Crennel, the former head coach of the Cleveland Browns and Kansas City Chiefs, and the interim head coach of the Houston Texans during the final 12 games of the 2020 season.

References
 

1948 births
Living people
African-American players of Canadian football
American football linebackers
Edmonton Elks players
Hamilton Tiger-Cats players
Montreal Alouettes players
Sportspeople from Lynchburg, Virginia
Pittsburgh Steelers players
Players of American football from Virginia
Saskatchewan Roughriders players
West Virginia Mountaineers football players
Winnipeg Blue Bombers players
21st-century African-American people
20th-century African-American sportspeople